Đulići is a village located in the Zvornik Municipality, Bosnia and Herzegovina.

Đulići is located around 12 km far from Zvornik.

Demographics
The 1991 census showed Đulići had a total population of 1043:
 1,022 – Muslims
 17 – Serbs
 4 – others

See also 
Bijeli Potok massacre

References

External links
Photo of Đulići
Photo of Đulići

Zvornik
Populated places in Zvornik